Jeffrey H. Goodman is a neuroscientist at Helen Hayes Hospital in West Haverstraw, New York. His work studying treatments for Epilepsy has been published in many journals (H-index 30) and presented at conferences all over the world. One of his recent publications involves a procedure for delivering a low frequency sine wave stimulation as a possible treatment . This abstract, co-authored by Jane Schon, Sudarshan Phani, and Jared Zucker, was published in the 2006 Abstract publication of Epilepsia (published by the American Epilepsy Society).

External links
Jeffrey H. Goodman Biography

References 

American neuroscientists
Year of birth missing (living people)
Living people